Aries Keck (born ) is the communications lead for Earth Applied Sciences at NASA HQ. She previously was the social media lead at NASA Goddard Space Flight Center in Greenbelt, Md, the first-ever time NASA Goddard had someone in that position full-time. Her previous position at NASA Goddard was as a science writer for Earth science missions.

Biography

Previous to being hired at NASA, Keck was the producer and director of Earthbeat Radio, an hour-long broadcast in America dedicated to global warming. From 2001 – 2006 Keck was a reporter for WHYY-FM in Philadelphia, for which she won a number of national Associated Press awards as well as a Gracie Award from American Women in Radio and Television. She is a frequent contributor to National Public Radio (NPR) and the public radio program Marketplace.

Keck is the author of the 2004 non-fiction book Einstein A to Z with co-author Karen C. Fox. She graduated from Lehigh University and lives in Washington, DC.

References

External links
C-SPAN biography page
Salon.com biography page
NASA Social Media Contacts

Living people
American radio journalists
Lehigh University alumni
1970 births
American women radio journalists
21st-century American women